Monsoon is the tenth studio album by Australian group, Little River Band, with Glenn Shorrock returning as lead singer after John Farnham left the group to release his solo album Whispering Jack. The album was released in May 1988 and peaked at number nine on the Kent Music Report albums chart.

Background 

Little River Band (LRB) issued Monsoon as their tenth studio album with the line-up of Graeham Goble on guitars and vocals, Stephen Housden on lead guitar, Wayne Nelson on bass guitar and vocals, Derek Pellicci on drums and Glenn Shorrock on lead vocals and keyboards. The Australian band had formed in Melbourne as a harmony rock group by Goble, Pellicci and Shorrock, they toured extensively in the United States and were later joined by Nelson and Housden. Shorrock left LRB in 1982 and Pellicci left in 1984. Shorrock's replacement on lead vocals John Farnham left in 1986 to return to his solo career and LRB remained in hiatus. Pellicci and Shorrock returned in July 1987 at the request of Irving Azoff, the head of MCA Records, who wanted the group on his label. According to Lisa Wallace, Pellicci and Shorrock's rejoining was due to "the fact that they still make good music together, and the money".

Monsoon peaked at number nine on the Australian Kent Music Report albums chart. It provided three Australian singles "Love Is a Bridge" (April 1988), "Son of a Famous Man" (August) and "Soul Searching" (September). Meanwhile "It's Cold Out Tonight" was issued in North American instead of "Soul Searching". Only "Love Is a Bridge" charted – it reached number six in Australia and number 18 on the US Billboard Adult Contemporary chart.

Reception 

The Canberra Times Lisa Wallace was disappointed by Monsoons lack of innovation despite the group showing technical skills.

Track listing

Personnel

Little River Band
 Glenn Shorrock – vocals, keyboards
 Graham Goble – guitar, vocals
 Stephen Housden – lead guitar
 Wayne Nelson – bass, lead vocals on "Inside Story"
 Derek Pellicci – drums

Additional musicians
 Chong Lim – synthesiser
 Jai Winding – piano
 John Kapek – keyboards
 Paulinho da Costa – percussion

Technical work
 John Boylan – producer
 Ian McKenzie – engineer
 Michael Wickow, Paul Grupp – additional engineers
 Barry Conley, Jim Champagne, Leanne Vallence, Leslie Ann Jones, Paul Wertheimer – assistant engineers
 Wally Traugott – mastering

Charts

References

1988 albums
Little River Band albums
Albums produced by John Boylan (record producer)
MCA Records albums